Procypris is a genus of cyprinid fish that is found in eastern Asia.  There are currently two recognized species in this genus.

Species
 Procypris mera S. Y. Lin, 1933
 Procypris rabaudi (T. L. Tchang, 1930)

References
 

Cyprinid fish of Asia
Cyprinidae genera